Talkin' About! is an album by American jazz guitarist Grant Green featuring performances recorded in 1964 and released on the Blue Note label. Green is supported by organist Larry Young and drummer Elvin Jones. It was reissued in Japan on CD with a slightly different cover: same design, but with a blue background.

Reception

The Allmusic review by Steve Huey awarded the album 4½ stars and stated "With just a basic organ trio lineup, the album works a fascinating middle ground between the soul-jazz of Green's early days and the modal flavor of his most recent work... It all makes for a terrific album that ranks in Green's uppermost echelon".

Track listing
 "Talkin' About J.C." (Larry Young) – 11:45
 "People" (Bob Merrill, Jule Styne) – 7:28
 "Luny Tune" (Larry Young) – 7:43
 "You Don't Know What Love Is" (Gene de Paul, Don Raye) – 7:38
 "I'm an Old Cowhand (From the Rio Grande)" (Johnny Mercer) – 6:31

Personnel
Grant Green - guitar
Larry Young - organ
Elvin Jones - drums

References

Grant Green albums
1965 albums
Blue Note Records albums
Albums produced by Alfred Lion
Albums recorded at Van Gelder Studio